Wolfram Heicking (born 19 May 1927) is a German composer, musicologist and music academy professor.

Biography 
Wolfram Heicking was born and grew up in Leipzig. His higher-level studies began in 1946 in the newly liberated city at the University of Music and Theatre (die "Staatliche Hochschule für Musik – Mendelssohn-Akademie", as it was renamed on 1 October 1946).   Leipzig had ended up being administered as part of the Soviet occupation zone, relaunched in October 1949 as the Soviet sponsored German Democratic Republic (East Germany) and it was in East Germany that Heicking made his professional career. At the  Mendelssohn Academy he studied piano with Hugo Steurer, music theory with Paul Schenk and composition with Wilhelm Weismann. He remained as a student at the academy till 1951, while undertaking parallel studies in musicology with Walter Serauky at the University of Leipzig.

His professional career began in 1951 with an appointment as an academic assistant at the Institute for Music Education at Berlin University. From 1952 he was also teaching composition at the nearby Hanns Eisler Music Academy ("Hochschule für Musik "Hanns Eisler" - as that institution was subsequently renamed). During this period he was working on his doctorate, which he received in 1959 for a piece of work entitled "Die Entwicklung von Klangvorstellungen" (loosely, "The development of ideas in sound"). Ten years later he was appointed to a professorship in composition.

As a composer, Wolfram Heicking's output is extensive.   His music organically combines various different styles and epochs. Jazz and pop elements are synthesised into classical structures. He has written instrumental music, stage works and songs. He has produced a large number of sound-track scores for radio plays and films.  Working with Gisela May, Kurt Masur, Manfred Krug and Jochen Kowalski, Prof. Wolfram Heicking is acknowledged as one of the "backroom boys" supporting the "Philharmonic Violins" ("Philharmonische Geigen") ensemble from the Berlin Philharmonic.

Today Heicking lives as a freelance composer in Kleinmachnow on the southern edge of Berlin.   A supportive newspaper report of his ninetieth birthday notes that he remains in place as the popular chairman of the Berlin Composers' Association, a post in which comrades continue to appreciate his open, thoughtful and undogmatic approach to current problems (genoss er auch... allseits Sympathien wegen seiner offenen, besonnenen, undogmatischen Herangehensweise an bestehende Probleme").

Evaluation 
As a university teacher Wolfram Heicking has taught many who later achieved success in their own right as musicians and composers.   These include Arnold Fritzsch, Günther Fischer, Barbara Thalheim, Lutz Glandien, Jürgen Ecke and Ralf Petersen.   His efforts to build bridges between "serious" and "light" music has, in particular, influenced a younger generation of artists.   His song, "Wenn du schläfst, mein Kind" ("If you sleep, my child"), sung by Manfred Krug and accompanied by Günther Fischer, has become an "evergreen" and continues to exemplify Heicking's success in blending different musical approaches.

Film scores (selection)

Awards and honours (selection)

Notes

References 

Musicians from Leipzig
20th-century German composers
20th-century classical composers
German operetta composers
German film score composers
Musicologists from Berlin
Recipients of the National Prize of East Germany
Recipients of the Patriotic Order of Merit (honor clasp)
Academic staff of the Hochschule für Musik Hanns Eisler Berlin
1927 births
Living people